Highway 903 is a  provincial highway in the north-west region of the Canadian province of Saskatchewan. It begins at Highway 55 in RM of Meadow Lake No. 588, east of the town of Meadow Lake, and heads north past Waterhen Lake, Keeley Lake, and Upper Cumins Lake. Along the way, it intersects Highway 941, Highway 904, and Highway 965 (at Cole Bay, on the south side of Canoe Lake), and provides access to Meadow Lake Provincial Park, Gladue Lake Indian reserve, and Waterhen Indian reserve. Highway 903 is about 179 km (111 mi) long.

See also
Roads in Saskatchewan
Transportation in Saskatchewan

References

External Links 
Saskatchewan Highways and Transportation, Saskatchewan Road Map, undated (ca. 2002 based on progress of twinning Highway 1)
Saskatchewan Highways and Transportation, Saskatchewan Maps (Rural Classification Map, Highway Traffic Volume Map, and Weight Classification Map)
Statistics Canada, GeoSearch2006 (for municipality boundaries)

903
Meadow Lake, Saskatchewan